"Give to the Winds Thy Fears" is a traditional Christian hymn in short metre with words written by John Wesley.

History and description
Its first verse is:

It is one of two hymns that Wesley published in 1739 that he had translated from "Befiehl du deine Wege", a longer 1653 hymn by German hymnwriter Paul Gerhardt, the other being "Commit thou all Thy Griefs".
The latter has 8 out of the original 12 verses by Gerhardt, and "Give" has 4 verses.
Wesley encountered Gerhardt's hymn sung by Moravians on his travels in the United States, and compiled it into the hymnal that he compiled for the people in Georgia where he lived for a while.
In his diary for 1737-05-07 he records "translated six hymns from the German while on a journey to another plantation".

In hymnals such as the U.S. Armed Forces Hymnal (1959) and The Presbyterian Hymnal (1990) it is set to the tune St Bride composed by Samuel Howard.

The Woman's Christian Temperance Union adopted the hymn as its "Crusade Hymn"; to be sung at meetings at local, state, and national levels of the organization.

Jars of Clay 

Christian rock band Jars of Clay recorded the hymn, slightly altering Wesley's lyrics, as "God Will Lift Up Your Head", released on its album Redemption Songs.
The song is the first of two radio singles in promotion of the album which hit number one on the Christian CHR radio charts in 2005.

Track listing
"God Will Lift Up Your Head" - 4:22

References

Bibliography

Further reading 
 
 

English Christian hymns
2005 singles
Jars of Clay songs
Songs written by Dan Haseltine
Songs written by Charlie Lowell
Songs written by Stephen Morris (musician)
Songs written by Matt Odmark
Essential Records (Christian) singles